The 1983 Atlanta Braves season was the 18th season in Atlanta along with the 113th overall.

Offseason
March 29, 1982: Luis Gomez was released by the Atlanta Braves.

Regular season 

The 1983 season was one of hope for the Braves of Atlanta. The previous season they had won 89 games and advanced to the playoffs before succumbing to the St. Louis Cardinals in three consecutive games. This was a season to prove that the 1982 National League West Division champions were no fluke.

Atlanta opened the season April 4 in Cincinnati. The Braves grabbed an early 3–0 lead in the game only to lose it 5–4. Atlanta promptly won 13 of its next 15 games and found themselves in first place with a 13–3 record. This included a seven-game winning streak after the opening day loss and a five-game winning streak that finished the 13–2 stretch. It appeared the Braves were no flukes after all. They were off to another great start and fans were hopeful that their Braves would win another NL Western Division Championship.

There was a stretch in late May and early June when Atlanta won seven of eight games to improve their mark to 34–17. However, they were in second place and trailed the Dodgers by  games. On June 5 the Braves lost 8–3 to the Cardinals but remained  games behind Los Angeles. On June 7 the Dodgers were in Atlanta for a three-game series. LA lost the opener 4–1 to Pascual Perez and their lead over the Braves was a mere half game. LA however bounced back to defeat the Braves twice, 11–5 and 4–2, expanding their lead over the Braves to  games. On June 22 the Braves had slipped to 39–29 and were  games behind LA. Atlanta had posted a 5–12 record from June 8 to 22.

This began to change for the Braves however. They won 10 of 12 games from June 24 to the All-Star Break. That streak moved them into first place all by themselves on July 4 with a 49–31 record and a one-game lead over the Dodgers. It was the best record in all Major League Baseball. It appeared the Braves were for real after all.

Second Half

The Braves were 61–37 on Sunday, July 24, coming off a 12–4 rout of Philadelphia. Atlanta had a -game lead in their division. It was also the second consecutive season the Braves had started 61–37. In 1982, the Braves lost 19 of their next 21 games after the 61–37 start. In 1983, it was hoped they would do better.

On Monday Atlanta blew a ninth-inning 4–1 lead to the Mets to slip to 61–38. On Tuesday the Braves lost 2–1 to the Mets in ten innings on a homer by Mookie Wilson. The Braves were 61–39 and already fans on WSB radio were complaining about another Braves collapse. However, the Braves won three of their next four to go to 64–40 and a six-game lead in the Western Division on July 30. On Thursday August 4 Atlanta routed the San Francisco Giants 8–1 to raise their record to 67–42. It was the first time since coming to Atlanta in 1966 that the Braves were 25 games above the .500 mark. The Braves also had a -game lead. The Braves salvaged the final game of the series with a 5–2 win on Sunday, upping their lead back to  games.

The Braves were 71–46 on Saturday, August 13, after beating the LA Dodgers 8–7 on a Bob Watson come -from- behind homer in the bottom of the ninth. The Braves were  games ahead of the Dodgers at this point and things were looking good for them. Braves fans were extremely enthusiastic and confident.

The next day the Braves lost 5–4 to the Dodgers and then on Monday August 15 they not only lost 4–0 to the San Diego Padres but they lost their cleanup hitter Bob Horner to a season-ending wrist injury. Horner was batting .303 with 20 homers at that point. His loss would prove to be a disaster for the Braves.

After Horner's injury the Braves spiraled down and were soon overtaken by the Dodgers. On August 29 the Braves slipped into second place behind LA with a 7–5 loss to the Chicago Cubs. This loss was the first of six straight. Overall, the Braves lost nine of ten games from August 25 to September 3, going from 75–51 and two games ahead to 76–60 and  out. On Sunday September 11 the Braves led Los Angeles 6–3 going into the bottom of the ninth. They were two games behind and were in position to cut the Dodger lead to one game. However, LA rallied to win 7–6, and their lead was three games over the Braves.

Atlanta trailed by as much as  games (September 23) following an 11–2 blowout at the hands of the Dodgers. The Braves were 82–70 at this point and were 11–24 since Watson's dramatic home run in August. Atlanta beat the Dodgers the next two games 3–2 and 7–1 to cut their deficit to  games. After splitting a two-game series with San Francisco, the Braves won two of three from the Houston Astros, and, with three games left in the season, the Braves were three games out. Atlanta lost to the San Diego Padres 3–2 on Friday night to fall four games out, eliminated from the playoffs. The Braves finished three games behind the Dodgers. It was a season of extreme excitement followed by profound disappointment.

Season standings

Record vs. opponents

Notable transactions 
 June 6, 1983: Jay Buhner was drafted by the Braves in the 9th round of the 1983 Major League Baseball draft, but did not sign.
 July 10, 1983: Paul Assenmacher was signed as an amateur free agent by the Braves.
 August 28, 1983: Braves traded Brett Butler, Brook Jacoby, and Rick Behenna to the Cleveland Indians for Len Barker.

Roster

Player stats

Batting

Starters by position 
Note: Pos = Position; G = Games played; AB = At bats; H = Hits; Avg. = Batting average; HR = Home runs; RBI = Runs batted in

Other batters 
Note: G = Games played; AB = At bats; H = Hits; Avg. = Batting average; HR = Home runs; RBI = Runs batted in

Pitching

Starting pitchers 
Note: G = Games pitched; IP = Innings pitched; W = Wins; L = Losses; ERA = Earned run average; SO = Strikeouts

Other pitchers 
Note: G = Games pitched; IP = Innings pitched; W = Wins; L = Losses; ERA = Earned run average; SO = Strikeouts

Relief pitchers 
Note: G = Games pitched; W = Wins; L = Losses; SV = Saves; ERA = Earned run average; SO = Strikeouts

Farm system

Notes

References 

1983 Atlanta Braves season at Baseball Reference

Atlanta Braves seasons
Atlanta Braves Season, 1983
Atlanta